Wólka Oleśnicka  is a hamlet of village in the administrative district of Gmina Oleśnica, within Staszów County, Świętokrzyskie Voivodeship, in south-central Poland.

References

Villages in Staszów County